October 28, the International Animation Day (IAD) was an international observance proclaimed in 2002 by the ASIFA as the main global event to celebrate the art of animation.

This day commemorates the first public performance of Charles-Émile Reynaud's Théâtre Optique at the Grevin Museum in Paris, 1892. In 1895, the Cinematograph of the Lumière brothers outshone Reynaud's invention, driving Émile to bankruptcy. However, his public performance of animation entered the history of optical entertainments as shortly predating the camera-made movies.

In recent years, the event has been observed in more than 50 countries with more than 1000 events, on every continent, all over the world. IAD was initiated by ASIFA, International Animated Film Association, a member of UNESCO. During International Animation Day cultural institutions are also invited to join in by screening animated films, organizing workshops, exhibiting artwork and stills, providing technical demonstrations, and organizing other events helping to promote the art of animation. Such a celebration is an outstanding opportunity of putting animated films in the limelight, making this art more accessible to the public.

ASIFA also commissions an artist to create an original art poster announcing the event each year.  It is then adapted for each country in order to guarantee a worldwide view of the event. Previous editions involved the work of animators such as Iouri Tcherenkov, Paul Driessen, Abi Feijo, Eric Ledune, Noureddin Zarrinkelk, Michel Ocelot, Nina Paley, Raoul Servais, Ihab Shaker and Gianluigi Toccafondo.

Full length animation films, historical features, animated shorts, and student films, all variety of animation art are shown in the workshops. These films display an extraordinary range of techniques – drawing, painting, animating puppets and objects, using clay, sand, paper, and computer.  Because many animated films are non-verbal, it is a rich opportunity for cross cultural expression and communication.

External links 
 International Animation Day official homepage
 International Animation Day at ASIFA's website.
 ASIFA's Facebook page.

International observances
International Animated Film Association
October observances
Animation events
Cartooning events